is a railway line in Shikoku, Japan, operated by the Shikoku Railway Company (JR Shikoku). It connects Tadotsu Station in Tadotsu, Kagawa, and Kubokawa Station in Shimanto, Kōchi. The line links the city of Kōchi with northern Shikoku and the island of Honshū via the Seto-Ōhashi Line. The first section of the line between Tadotsu and Kotohira opened in 1889, Kochi was connected to the northern section of the line in 1935, and the western extension of the line was completed in 1951.

History
The first section opened, between Tadotsu and Kotohira, was constructed by the Sanuki Railway Co. in 1889. The company was nationalised in 1906.

The Kotohira - Awa Ikeda section was opened in 1914 and connected to the Tokushima line.

The Susaki - Kochi - Kusaka section opened in 1924, and was extended north in sections 1925-35, where it connected to the northern section at Minawa, the line from Awa Ikeda having been extended there in 1931.

The Susaki - Tosakume section opened 1939, with extensions to Kageno opening 1947 and to Kubakawa in 1951.

CTC signalling was commissioned between Tadotsu - Kochi in 1967, and the 4,180m Oboke tunnel and associated realignment opened the following year.

The 2,583m Osugi tunnel and associated realignment opened in 1973. CTC signalling was extended to Kubokawa in 1986, and the Tadotsu - Kotohira section was electrified the following year prior to the privatization of JNR. However, the maximum speed of electric trains in this section is limited to 85 km/h due to the overhead catenary being a direct-line suspension system (similar to trams) as a result of a lack of funds during construction at the end of the JNR era. On the other hand, the diesel-powered limited express JR Shikoku 2000 series is able to run at 120 km/h, while regular diesel trains can run at 95 km/h. As such, the diesel trains operating in this section is able to run faster than electric trains. To reduce the burden on the overhead catenary, electric trains operate with only one raised pantograph in addition to the speed limit. The overhead catenary of platform 1 at Kotohira Station is the only section along the entire line to have a Simple Catenary System typically used on electrified JR lines.

After the privatization of JNR, there was a plan to electrify the Dosan Line to Awa-Ikeda along with the Yosan Line, but the former did not come to fruition. The reasoning being the low return on investments due to the sharp decline in traffic south of Kotohira, and the many narrow tunnels making the installation of overhead wires difficult. As such, it was decided that a more rational plan was to introduce new high-speed diesel trains for limited express operations as opposed to electrification. In a 2006 submission to the subcommittees of the Ministry of Land, Infrastructure, Transport and Tourism, JR Shikoku cited the electrification of the Kotohira - Kochi section as one of the desired long-term investments.

Freight trains ceased operating between Tadotsu - Kochi in 2005.

Former connecting lines
 Kotohira station - The Kotohira Express Railway Co. operated a 16 km line to Sakaide on the Yosan Line 1930-44, with the line formally closing in 1954.
 Tadotsu station - The Kotohira Sangu Railway Co. operated a 27 km line to Sakaide 1922/28 - 1963, with a 7 km branch to Kotohira operated 1923-63.

Services 

 limited express trains make 14 round-trips per day between Okayama and Kōchi, Nakamura, or Sukumo.  limited expresses make five round trips per day between Takamatsu and Kōchi, Nakamura, or Sukumo. The  rapid service trains link Kotohira and Takamatsu once an hour.

The line is generally divided into three parts for local services at Awa-Ikeda and Kōchi. For the segment between Tadotsu and Kotohira, there are through services to/from Okayama and Takamatsu. The Tosa Kuroshio Railway Gomen-Nahari Line has through service to/from Kōchi.

Stations 
 Local trains generally stop at all stations, but sometimes skip stations marked "▽".
 Sunport (Takamatsu - Tadotsu - Kotohira) rapid trains stop at all stations on the Dosan Line.
 See the articles on the Nanpū and Shimanto limited express services for details of station stops.
 Trains are able to pass each other at stations marked "◇" and "◆" (switchback); trains cannot pass at stations marked "｜".

See also
List of railway lines in Japan

References
This article incorporates material from the corresponding article in the Japanese Wikipedia

External links

 JR Shikoku official website 

 
Lines of Shikoku Railway Company
Rail transport in Kagawa Prefecture
Rail transport in Tokushima Prefecture
Rail transport in Kōchi Prefecture
1067 mm gauge railways in Japan
Railway lines opened in 1889